Cathcart Old Church is a Parish church of the Church of Scotland, located in the Cathcart area of Glasgow.

Previous Churches
The first church in Cathcart was built in the 9th century. In 1707, a church was built to replace the medieval church, which was then rebuilt in 1744. In 1831, a new church in the Neo-Gothic style was designed by James Dempster, and replaced the 18th century church, which had fallen into disrepair. The church stood until 1931, when its body was demolished. Its bell tower still stands.

Present Church
The present Cathcart Old Church was built in a medieval Gothic style on designs by Henry Edward Clifford, but which was completed under Watson, Salmond & Gray. Construction commenced in 1914, but was halted due to WWI. In 1923 the building continued until it was completed by 1929. Big buttresses, a square tower, and a simplified hammerbeam roof were built. In 1962, the north transept was converted into the McKellar Memorial Chapel. The church includes a tapestry of The Last Supper by Charles Marshall, and stained glass windows by James Crombie.

References

Protestant churches converted from Roman Catholicism
Rebuilt churches in the United Kingdom
Churches completed in 1929
Church of Scotland churches in Glasgow
Listed churches in Glasgow
Category B listed buildings in Glasgow
1914 establishments in Scotland